Vasum caestus, common name the helmet vase, is a species of medium to large sea snail, a marine gastropod mollusk in the family Turbinellidae.

Distribution
This marine species occurs in the Caribbean Sea (Florida, West Indies) and in the Pacific Ocean (Mexico, Panama, Ecuador, Galapagos Islands).

Shell description
The length of the shell varies between 57 mm and 135 mm.

References

 Keen, A. M. (1971). Sea Shells of Tropical West America. Marine mollusks from Baja California to Peru. ed. 2. Stanford University Press. xv, 1064 pp., 22 pls

External links
 Broderip, W. J. (1833). Characters of new species of Mollusca and Conchifera, collected by Mr. Cuming. Proceedings of the Zoological Society of London. 1: 4-8.

caestus
Gastropods described in 1833